The Hidden Perils Of Dancing is the second EP released by Sucioperro on 11 November 2004 through Adorno Records. It was distributed to stores through Cargo as well as being sold at the band's gigs. Its entire pressing of 1,000 copies sold out quickly and it is now a sought after CD.

The EP features "The Drop", which is the only track from the first two EPs to appear on the debut album Random Acts of Intimacy, for which it was re-recorded and later released as a single in 2006.

Track listing

Personnel
JP Reid - Vocals and guitar
Mike Logg - Bass and vocals
Brendan Reilly - Drums
Chris McMillan - Engineer

2004 EPs
Sucioperro albums